Coprosma rugosa, also known as the needle-leaved mountain coprosma, is a shrub in the coffee family, Rubiaceae, that is native to New Zealand. 

It is found in grasslands and forest margins up to the subalpine zone. C. rugosa bears small purple-white berries in autumn, the seed of which is widely dispersed by birds. 

It is considered a very hardy shrub and is suitable for hedging.

References

The Native Trees of New Zealand, J. T. Salmon, Heinemann Reed, Auckland, 1990, p. 293

rugosa
Plants described in 1906
Flora of New Zealand
Divaricating plants
Taxa named by Thomas Frederic Cheeseman